Coal Run is an unincorporated community in Coal Township in Northumberland County, Pennsylvania, United States. Coal Run is located at the intersection of Hickory Road and Fidler Green Road east of Shamokin.

References

Unincorporated communities in Northumberland County, Pennsylvania
Unincorporated communities in Pennsylvania